Benjamin Chadwick Stanley (born January 29, 1976) is a former American football punter. He played college football at Kilgore College before transferring to Stephen F. Austin State University. He was signed by the San Francisco 49ers as an undrafted free agent in 1999.

Stanley has also been a member of the Arizona Cardinals, Houston Texans and Indianapolis Colts.

Early years
Stanley attended Ore City High School in Ore City, Texas, and was a letterwinner in football, basketball, baseball, and track. In football, he won All-District honors at punter.

Professional career
He was not drafted to the National Football League but was signed by the San Francisco 49ers in 1999. He remained with that team for 2 years before moving to the Arizona Cardinals for a year and then to Houston to be the starter for the expansion team, the Houston Texans.  Until Andre Johnson was named Offensive Player of the Week for Week 4 of the 2006 NFL season, Stanley was the only Texans player to ever be named Player of the Week.

Achievements
Stanley's most notable achievement is the NFL record for most punts in a season at 114.

Post-football career
Stanley is currently the Director of Development at KVNE in Tyler, Texas and has been since November 2010.

References

External links
Indianapolis Colts bio

1976 births
Living people
People from Upshur County, Texas
American football punters
Kilgore Rangers football players
Stephen F. Austin Lumberjacks football players
San Francisco 49ers players
Arizona Cardinals players
Houston Texans players
Indianapolis Colts players